Trebež is a small settlement in the hills southeast of Muljava in the Municipality of Ivančna Gorica in central Slovenia. The area is part of the historical region of Lower Carniola. The municipality is now included in the Central Slovenia Statistical Region.

A small roadside chapel-shrine in the settlement dates to the early 20th century.

References

External links
Trebež on Geopedia

Populated places in the Municipality of Ivančna Gorica